Fever Kingdoms is an EP by the heavy metal band Pyrrhon. It was released on October 26, 2010 on Path Less Traveled Records.

Track listing

Personnel
Adapted from the Fever Kingdoms liner notes.

Pyrrhon
 Alex Cohen – drums
 Dylan DiLella – electric guitar
 Doug Moore – vocals
 Mike Sheen – bass guitar

Production and additional personnel
 Caroline Harrison – cover art, design
 Colin Marston – mastering
 Dan Pilla – recording, mixing

Release history

References

External links 
 
 Fever Kingdoms at Bandcamp

2010 debut EPs
Pyrrhon (band) albums